Ramalina subfarinacea is a species of lichen in the family Ramalinaceae. It was first described by Finnish lichenologist William Nylander in 1872 as Ramalina scopulorum var. subfarinacea. Nylander promoted it to species status in another publication that year.

Ramalina subfarinacea is known to contain both stictic acid and usnic acid.

References

subfarinacea
Lichen species
Lichens described in 1872
Fungi of Europe
Taxa named by James Mascall Morrison Crombie